Love Can Build a Bridge is the sixth and final studio album by American country music duo the Judds, released by RCA Nashville in September 1990. It features the singles "Born to Be Blue", the title track, and "One Hundred and Two". The title track has later been covered by several other artists.

Critical reception

Billboard published a mixed review of the album in the September 22, 1990 issue. The review praised the Judds "striking vocal harmonies," but criticized the album as not "memorable." The review said the album lacks a "clarifying observation," a "soul-revealing story," or a "final-word phrase," leaving the listener wishing for "more substance."

Track listing

Personnel

The Judds
 Naomi Judd - vocals
 Wynonna Judd - vocals

Additional musicians
 Eddie Bayers - drums
 Craig Bickhardt - acoustic guitar
 Mark Casstevens - acoustic guitar
 Christ Church Choir - choir
 Paul Franklin - acoustic slide guitar, steel guitar
 Sonny Garrish - dobro, steel guitar
 John Barlow Jarvis - piano
 Farrell Morris - percussion
 Bobby Ogdin - organ, piano
 Don Potter - acoustic guitar, electric guitar
 Bonnie Raitt - electric slide guitar
 Mark Tanner - cello
 Jack Williams - bass guitar

Chart performance

References

The Judds albums
1990 albums
Curb Records albums
RCA Records albums
Albums produced by Brent Maher